Ramaria araiospora, commonly known as the red coral, is a coral mushroom in the family Gomphaceae. First described in 1974, it is found in North America, and the Himalaya. An edible species, it is sold in local markets in Mexico.

Taxonomy
The species was first described scientifically by mycologists Currie Marr and Daniel Stuntz in their 1974 monograph, "Ramaria of western Washington". The holotype was collected in 1967 in Pierce County, Washington. Ramaria araiospora is classified in the subgenus Laeticolora of Ramaria. The mushroom is commonly known as the "red coral".

Description

The terminal branches are forked or finely divided into sharp tips. The context is fleshy to fibrous in young specimens, but becomes brittle when dried. The branches are red initially, fading to a lighter red in maturity, while the base, including the stipe, is white to yellowish-white. Branch tips are yellow. When dried, fruit bodies become yellowish white in the base and dull red in the branches. The fruit bodies have no distinctive taste or odor.

In deposit, the spores are white, cream, or yellowish. They are somewhat cylindrical, ornamented with lobed warts, and measure 9.9 by 3.7 μm. The basidia (spore-bearing cells) are club-shaped, one- to four-spored (although four spores is most typical), and have dimensions of 43–75 by 7–12 μm.  The variety rubella differs from the main type in having slightly more "bluish or crimson" branches in mature specimens, and slightly smaller basidia that measure 30–70 by 6–10 μm.

Edibility

Ramaria araiospora fruit bodies are edible, but can result in an upset stomach. In the Villa del Carbón municipality of Mexico, where they are known locally as patitas de pájaro ("bird's legs"), patitas temblonas ("trembling legs"), or patitas rojas ("red legs"), the fungi are favored for their fleshy consistency, mild flavor, and abundance. They are usually sold in lots averaging  (containing about 15 fruit bodies), at a price between $10 and 20 USD.

Habitat and distribution
Although it is not known with certainty, the species is probably mycorrhizal. Fruit bodies grow on the ground singly or scattered, under conifers, especially western hemlock, and deciduous trees, particularly tanoak. Fruiting usually occurs in September and November. The species is primarily known from the Pacific Northwest region of North America, although it (or a very similar, undescribed species) has been reported from Kansas.  Variety rubella has been collected in the eastern Himalaya and Mexico.

Similar species
Ramaria stuntzii is similar in appearance, with a larger base, reddish-orange branches below, and is amyloid (unlike R. araiospora). R. cyaneigranosa is also similar, varying mostly in microscopic details.

References

External links

Gomphaceae
Edible fungi
Fungi described in 1974
Fungi of Asia
Fungi of North America